The large Cordillera shrew-mouse (Archboldomys maximus) is a species of rodent in the family Muridae found only in the Philippines.

References

Rats of Asia
Endemic fauna of the Philippines
Fauna of Luzon
Rodents of the Philippines
Mammals described in 2012
Archboldomys